St Olga Ukrainian Catholic Church, Woodston, Peterborough, England was built in 1964, and named for Olga of Kyiv. There is a Ukrainian Mission based in this church.  The parish priest is Fr Roman Badiak.

It is part of the Ukrainian Greek Catholic Church and the Apostolic Exarchate for Ukrainians while also being part of the Catholic Church in England and Wales.  It is part of the Catholic parish of St Peter and All Souls, Peterborough.

References

Ukrainian Catholic churches in the United Kingdom
Ukrainian diaspora in the United Kingdom
Roman Catholic churches in Cambridgeshire
Roman Catholic churches completed in 1964
Saint Olga
20th-century Roman Catholic church buildings in the United Kingdom